Guangdong-Hong Kong Cup 1981–82 is the fourth staging of this two-leg competition between Hong Kong and Guangdong.

The first leg was played in Hong Kong Stadium on 3 January 1982 while the second leg was played in Guangzhou on 12 January 1982.

Hong Kong won the Cup by winning 3–2 after extra time.

Squads

Hong Kong
General Manager：  Cheung Chi Wai 張志威、  Wong Chong San 黃創山
Manager：  Chan Fai Hung 陳輝洪
Assistant Manager：  Leung Tak Shing 梁德成
Physio：  Leung Chung Wai 梁仲偉
Some of the players in the squad:
  Leung Shui Wing 梁帥榮
  Choi York Yee 蔡育瑜
  Chi Yat Bo 池一坡
  Chan Sai Kau 陳世九
  Wu Kwok Hung 胡國雄
  Lai Wing Cheung 黎永昌
  Lai Sun Cheung 黎新祥
  Tsui Kwok On 徐國安
  Leung Chun-kuen 梁振權
  Theo de Jong 迪莊 (playing for Seiko)
  Jan Verheijen 華希恩 (playing for Seiko)
   加納 (playing for Seiko)
  Johannes Gerardes Wildbret 韋伯 (playing for Seiko)
   哥倫布 (playing for Seiko)
  Cees Storm 史唐 (playing for Seiko)
  Dieter Schwemmle 舒力拿 (playing for Bulova)
  Chow Chee Keong 仇志強 (playing for Bulova)
  Werner Reich 烈治 (playing for Bulova)
  Peter Sharne 沙尼 (playing for Eastern)

Guangdong
General Manager：  Zhang Riyang 張日揚
Manager:  Xian Dixiong 冼迪雄
Physio：  Ye Wang 葉旺
Some of the players in the squad:
  Wang Huiliang 王惠良
  Huang Junwei 黃軍偉
  Huang Debao 黃德保
  Liu Quan 劉全
  Lu Sheng 盧勝
  Wei Xiaole 魏小樂
  Wu Yaqi 吳亞七
  Wu Yuhua 吳育華
  Xie Zhixiong 謝志雄
  Ye Xiquan 葉細權
  Zhong Xiaojian 鐘小健
  Cao Yang 曹陽
  Chen Jiming 陳繼銘
  Chen Yuliang 陳玉良
  Chi Minghua 池明華
  He Jinlun 何錦倫
  Li Chaoyang 李朝陽

Trivia
 This was the first time to include non-Chinese players on the Hong Kong team.
 This was the first time to have a match go into extra time.

Results
First Leg

Second Leg

References

External links
 HKFA website 省港盃回憶錄(四) (in Chinese)
 Seiko 超強陣容 (in Chinese)

Guan
1981-82
1982 in Chinese football